"Alone in This World" is a song by American singer Faith Evans. It was written by Sean "P. Diddy" Combs, Mechalie Jamison, Michael Carlos Jones, Jack Knight, Herbert Magidson, Mario Winans, and Allie Wrubel for her third studio album Faithfully (2001). Production was helmed by Combs and Winans. The son contains a sample from "Who Shot Ya?" (1995) by American rapper The Notorious B.I.G. Diddy.  Due to the inclusion of the sample, several other writers are credited as songwriters. The song was released as the album's fourth and final single in April 2002 and reached number 73 on the US Billboard Hot R&B/Hip-Hop Songs chart. Rapper Jay-Z appeared on a remix version of the song.

Critical reception
BBC Music's Keysha Davis found that "this moody track provides the perfect accompaniment to Faith's raspy, vocals, as she echoes the bewilderment of a lover gone astray, leaving her to fend for herself in this world." NME wrote that "opener "Alone in This World" is a tight Eve-esque number," Tracey E. Hopkins from Rolling Stone called the song "dance-floor ready."

Credits and personnel 
Credits adapted from the liner notes of Faithfully.

Sean "P. Diddy" Combs – mixing producer, writer
Faith Evans – writer, vocals
Mechalie Jamison – writer
Michael Carlos Jones – writer
Scott Kieklak – engineering assistant
Jack Knight – writer
Paul Logus – mixing

Herbert Magidson – writer
Nashiem Myrick – writer
Jon Nettlesbey – engineering assistant
Adonis Shropshire – backing vocals
Christopher Wallace – writer
Mario Winans – producer, writer
Allie Wrubel – writer

Charts

References

Faith Evans songs
2003 singles
Songs with music by Allie Wrubel
Songs with lyrics by Herb Magidson
Songs written by Mario Winans
Songs written by Sean Combs
Songs written by Jack Knight (songwriter)
2001 songs
Songs written by Faith Evans
Songs written by the Notorious B.I.G.